Nils Fredrik Julius Aars (9 March 1807 – 11 June 1865) was a Norwegian priest and politician.

He was born in Enebakk as a son of priest and politician Jens Aars (1780–1834). His grandfather migrated to Norway from Aars, Denmark in 1757. Aars married Sophie Stabell, and the couple had several children, including the writer Sophus Christian Munk Aars. Nils was also an uncle of banker and politician Jens Ludvig Andersen Aars and a first cousin of educator Jacob Jonathan Aars.

He was elected to the Norwegian Parliament in 1848 and 1851, representing the constituency of Finmarkens Amt. He was a vicar there. He died in 1865 in Østre Toten.

References

1807 births
1865 deaths
People from Enebakk
Norwegian people of Danish descent
Norwegian priest-politicians
Members of the Storting
Finnmark politicians